Izatha lignyarcha is a moth of the family Oecophoridae. It is endemic to New Zealand, where it is known only from higher altitudes on the North Island volcanoes (Mount Taranaki and Mount Ruapehu), except for one specimen from Taupo and one from Masterton.

The wingspan is 24.5–30 mm for males and 24–31 mm for females. Adults have been recorded in November, December, January and February.

Etymology
The specific name is derived from the Greek lignys (meaning smoke mixed with flame, murky fire) and archos (indicating leadership or command) and refers to the moth's fearless occupancy of one active and one dormant volcano.

References

Oecophorinae